In physics, the reduced mass is the "effective" inertial mass appearing in the two-body problem of Newtonian mechanics. It is a quantity which allows the two-body problem to be solved as if it were a one-body problem. Note, however, that the mass determining the gravitational force is not reduced. In the computation, one mass can be replaced with the reduced mass, if this is compensated by replacing the other mass with the sum of both masses. It has the dimensions of mass, and SI unit kg.

Equation

Given two bodies, one with mass m1 and the other with mass m2, the equivalent one-body problem, with the position of one body with respect to the other as the unknown, is that of a single body of mass

where the force on this mass is given by the force between the two bodies.

Properties

The reduced mass is always less than or equal to the mass of each body:

and has the reciprocal additive property:

which by re-arrangement is equivalent to half of the harmonic mean.

In the special case that :

If , then .

Derivation

The equation can be derived as follows.

Newtonian mechanics

Using Newton's second law, the force exerted by a body (particle 2) on another body (particle 1) is:

The force exerted by particle 1 on particle 2 is:

According to Newton's third law, the force that particle 2 exerts on particle 1 is equal and opposite to the force that particle 1 exerts on particle 2:

Therefore:

The relative acceleration arel between the two bodies is given by:

Note that (since the derivative is a linear operator) the relative acceleration  is equal to the acceleration of the separation  between the two particles.

This simplifies the description of the system to one force (since ), one coordinate , and one mass . Thus we have reduced our problem to a single degree of freedom, and we can conclude that particle 1 moves with respect to the position of particle 2 as a single particle of mass equal to the reduced mass, .

Lagrangian mechanics

Alternatively, a Lagrangian description of the two-body problem gives a Lagrangian of

where  is the position vector of mass  (of particle ). The potential energy V is a function as it is only dependent on the absolute distance between the particles. If we define 

and let the centre of mass coincide with our origin in this reference frame, i.e. 
,
then

Then substituting above gives a new Lagrangian

where

is the reduced mass. Thus we have reduced the two-body problem to that of one body.

Applications

Reduced mass can be used in a multitude of two-body problems, where classical mechanics is applicable.

Moment of inertia of two point masses in a line

where  is the sum of both distances .

This holds for a rotation around the center of mass.
The moment of inertia around this axis can be then simplified to

Collisions of particles

In a collision with a coefficient of restitution e, the change in kinetic energy can be written as 

,

where vrel is the relative velocity of the bodies before collision.

For typical applications in nuclear physics, where one particle's mass is much larger than the other the reduced mass can be approximated as the smaller mass of the system. The limit of the reduced mass formula as one mass goes to infinity is the smaller mass, thus this approximation is used to ease calculations, especially when the larger particle's exact mass is not known.

Motion of two massive bodies under their gravitational attraction

In the case of the gravitational potential energy 

we find that the position of the first body with respect to the second is governed by the same differential equation as the position of a body with the reduced mass orbiting a body with a mass equal to the sum of the two masses, because

Non-relativistic quantum mechanics

Consider the electron (mass me) and proton (mass mp) in the hydrogen atom. They orbit each other about a common centre of mass, a two body problem. To analyze the motion of the electron, a one-body problem, the reduced mass replaces the electron mass

and the proton mass becomes the sum of the two masses

This idea is used to set up the Schrödinger equation for the hydrogen atom.

Other uses

"Reduced mass" may also refer more generally to an algebraic term of the form 

that simplifies an equation of the form

The reduced mass is typically used as a relationship between two system elements in parallel, such as resistors; whether these be in the electrical, thermal, hydraulic, or mechanical domains.  A similar expression appears in the transversal vibrations of beams for the elastic moduli. This relationship is determined by the physical properties of the elements as well as the continuity equation linking them.

See also

Center-of-momentum frame
Momentum conservation
Defining equation (physics)
Harmonic oscillator
Chirp mass, a relativistic equivalent used in the post-Newtonian expansion

References

External links
Reduced Mass on HyperPhysics

Mechanics
Mass